Duke Yang of Lu (died 988 BC or 989 BC), personal name Ji Xi, was the third ruler of the state of Lu during the Zhou dynasty. He was a son of Bo Qin, the first duke, and succeeded his brother Duke Kao. He died after a rule of six years, and was succeeded by his son Duke You.

References

Monarchs of Lu (state)
Chinese dukes
10th-century BC Chinese monarchs